Bree-Anna Cheatham (born 29 March 1997) is an Australian rugby union player. She plays for the Queensland Reds in the Super W competition.

Cheatham missed the entire 2022 Super W season due to injury. She was named in Australia's squad for the Pacific Four Series in June, but didn't get to run out onto the field. She was reselected for the Wallaroos squad for the Laurie O'Reilly Cup in August. She made her international debut against New Zealand on 20 August 2022.

Cheatham was selected in the team again for the delayed 2022 Rugby World Cup in New Zealand.

References

External links
Wallaroos Profile

Living people
1997 births
Australia women's international rugby union players
Australian female rugby union players